"Mah Nà Mah Nà" is a popular song by Italian composer Piero Umiliani. It originally appeared in the Italian film Sweden: Heaven and Hell (Svezia, inferno e paradiso). It was a minor radio hit in the United States and in Britain, but became better known internationally for its use by The Muppets and on The Benny Hill Show.

"Mah Nà Mah Nà" first gained popularity in English-speaking countries from its use in the recurring cold open blackout sketch for the 1969–1970 season of The Red Skelton Show first airing in October 1969.

Sesame Street producer Joan Ganz Cooney heard the track on the radio and decided it would be a perfect addition to the show. It was first performed by Jim Henson (Kermit the Frog, et al.), Frank Oz (Miss Piggy, et al.) and Loretta Long (Susan) on the fourteenth episode of the show, broadcast on November 27, 1969. The following Sunday, Henson and his Muppets performed the song on The Ed Sullivan Show.  Seven years later the song was part of the premiere episode of The Muppet Show in 1976.

Starting in 1971, The Benny Hill Show — in its second incarnation now at Thames Television where it launched in 1969 in colour — implemented "Mah Nà Mah Nà" as part of a comic background music medley that would run during their often-filmed slapstick sketches. The medley became a Benny Hill Show tradition for the rest of its run.

Original version
Although Umiliani used a very similar theme in 1966 for the soundtrack of the Italian film  (international title: Ring Around The World), "Mah Nà Mah Nà" debuted as part of Umiliani's soundtrack for the Italian mondo film  (Sweden: Heaven and Hell [lit. Hell and Heaven]) (1968), an exploitation documentary film about wild sexual activity and other behaviour in Sweden. The song accompanied a scene in the film set in a sauna which gave its original title "" ("Hooray for the Swedish Sauna"). It was performed by a band called Marc 4 (four session musicians from the RAI orchestra) and the lead part was sung by Italian singer/composer Alessandro Alessandroni and his wife Giulia. The song also appeared on the 1968 U.S. soundtrack album released for the film.

"Mah Nà Mah Nà" was a hit in many countries in 1968–1969. In the United States, it peaked at No. 55 in the Billboard Hot 100 singles chart and No. 44 on the Cash Box magazine chart in October 1969. It also reached No. 12 on the United States Adult Contemporary chart. In Canada, the song reached No. 22 in the RPM magazine top singles charts, October 11, 1969, and No. 5 on the AC Chart a week later. The original UK single release, on the Pye International label (7N 25499), left the artists name uncredited on the label, and a cover version by Giorgio Moroder, pseudonymously credited to "The Great Unknowns" and released the same year on the Major Minor label (MM 658), featured Moroder's "Doo-be-doo-be-do" on the B side (also sometimes featured in The Benny Hill Show). Umiliani's original version, now credited to Umiliani on the label, was reissued by EMI Records in the UK in 1977 and reached No. 8 in the charts. During its 1–15 September 1969 run on the WLS 890 Hit Parade, the surveys erroneously credited the record to someone named Pete Howard. WPTR did much the same, except that the credit was given to the station's Disc Jockey J.W. Wagner.

The song's lyrics contain no actual words, only iambic nonsense syllables resembling scat singing. At times, melodies from other songs are quoted. One quoted melody is  the First Swedish Rhapsody of Hugo Alfvén. The Italian tune "Santa Lucia" is also quoted. In the movie soundtrack version, from which the record was edited, there is a quote of Army bugle call "Assembly", but this verse was omitted from the record, which instead repeated the first three verses. The Muppets' version includes part of "Lullaby of Birdland" by George Shearing.

Chart history

Other versions
In 1969, Henri Salvador recorded a variation titled "Mais non, mais non" ("But No, But No" or "Of Course Not, Of Course Not"), with lyrics he had written in French to Umiliani's tune.

Giorgio Moroder released a version in 1969 under the pseudonyms "The Great Unknowns" (UK 45) and the "Stop Studio Group" (French 45).

In 1969, the Dave Pell Singers recorded a version for Liberty Records which achieved considerable radio exposure.

In 1969, "Mah-Nà-Mah-Nà" was recorded in French by Midas (Roger Giguère).

During its 1969–70 season, The Red Skelton Show used the Umiliani recording as background music for a recurring blackout sketch (used as a cold open to the program, before the opening introductory sequence). The otherwise silent bits featured Red and another performer, dressed as moon creatures, playing with equipment left behind by the Project Apollo astronauts.

The song is the title track of a 1970 LP on GRT Records (Cat No.: GRT 20003), released after the initial success of Sesame Street; it is purportedly sung by a fuzzy Muppet lookalike, who is pictured on the sleeve. Other songs on the album, including "Peg O' My Heart", "Zip A Dee Doo Dah", "Mississippi Mud", and "Santa Claus Is Comin' To Town", are sung with the syllables "mah na mah na" filling in for the actual words of the song. Many tracks also feature kazoo accompaniment.

In 1971, a Hebrew version, "Parah Parah" ("cow by cow", slang for "one thing at a time"), was released by the duo HaDudaim.

In 1971 it was recorded by Arthur Fiedler and the Boston Pops for Polydor Records.

In 1973, a rendition of "Mah Nà Mah Nà" on the Moog synthesizer was released on the album More Hot Butter (Musicor MS 3254) by Hot Butter, best known for the pop tune "Popcorn". It was re-released on CD in 2000.

In 1984, Odessa comic and pantomime group Maski debuted on television with their short theatrical performance "Vocal duet" for Vokrug smekha comedy TV program. A Pierrot characters (Aleksandr Postolenko) spelling "mana mana", while his Harlequin partner (Georgiy Deliev) singing motive of the rest of the song.

American disco group Lipstique released a disco version of the song in 1978.

A heavy metal version was recorded by UK band Skin in 1996, for the "Perfect Day" single; a minor hit in the UK – No. 33. The song is however titled "The Muppet Song (Mah Na Mah Na)".

The British pop group Vanilla also used the song as a basis for their first single "No Way, No Way" in 1997.

A Canadian Dunkin' Donuts commercial used the song to promote its "Mini Donuts" line in the early 1990s.

In Australia, the song was used as a jingle in television commercials for sunscreen brand Banana Boat in the 1990s and 2000s, with its lyrics modified so that the name of the product was used in place of the song's title.

In 1999, the Brazilian band Pato Fu used samples of "Mah Nà Mah Nà" in the song "Made In Japan" on the album Isopor.

In 2003, several cast members perform their version in the opening scene of episode 1, season 2 of the UK series The Office.

A sketch in the final episode of Jam in 2000 features a scene where two strangely dressed characters, one carrying a clarinet, sing the song where and when police are trying to find a dead body. When the police find the corpse and are still examining it, the two characters continue to sing the song at the corpse, whilst the clarinet carrier puts the clarinet into the corpse's mouth, who "plays" it out of key.

The musical group Cake recorded a horn-driven version of this song featuring many different sounds. This version was recorded as a children's song and appears on an album called For the Kids, released in 2002, and on their compilation album, B-Sides and Rarities, released in 2007.

Surrounding Super Bowl XL in 2006, a version of the song was recorded for the Pittsburgh Steelers, replacing the title syllables with "Polamalu", the last name of the Steelers' star strong safety.

Since 2009, the pro soccer team Philadelphia Union's fan supporters, the Sons of Ben, have used the song, substituting the group's name in place of the song's title.

A version sung in Arabic was released by actor/singer Samir Ghanem using the words anam, anam (meaning "sleep, sleep").

In 2011, alternative rock band The Fray released a cover of the song on Muppets: The Green Album, though a remaster of the original version from The Muppet Show performance appears on the soundtrack from the 2011 film The Muppets.

The Mexican department store chain Sanborns used a version of this song for their animated commercials featuring the "Tecolotes" (Owl) family mascots.

A cover version of the song was made for the popular music/rhythm game Just Dance 2015.

The Benny Hill Show version

In 1969, British comedian Benny Hill switched from BBC Television to Thames Television. This move also marked the major start of color television in the United Kingdom. As part of the new format by Benny Hill, many risque jokes and sketches were featured. As with the signature "Yakety Sax" instrumental on the end of each show, the implementation of "Mah Na Mah Na" on Benny Hill was used to great effect to reflect the comedy action of particular sketches—notably the ones providing the backdrop of the story of the moment, most often sped up and (mostly) with no audible dialogue.

On the new Thames incarnation of The Benny Hill Show, "Mah Na Mah Na" was part of an organized, horn-driven, four-song instrumental comic medley, starting off with a percussion tapping beat of the track leading into a rendition of "Doo-Bee-Doo-Bee-Doo", a very early track written by famed record producer Giorgio Moroder, which in itself was loosely based on and, as a result, bears a tightly similar rhythm and style to "Mah Na Mah Na". The four-song medley then continues with a rendition of "Für Elise" (which is always heard with the accompaniment of a flute and a muted trumpet), then "Mah Na Mah Na", finally finishing with "Gimme Dat Ding", then looping back to the start of the progression.

This medley was first used on Thames Episode 10, which was first screened on British television on November the 24th, 1971. The original recordings of the instrumental medley often featured vocals by Benny Hill's backing chorus, The Ladybirds. However, as there were numerous recordings and renditions of the "Benny Hill Medley" throughout the entire Thames run, some versions featured other female vocalists (after The Ladybirds departed the show) while the rest of them were otherwise completely instrumental.

Versions by the Muppets
Aside from its notoriety as the primary silent comedy sketch scene music for The Benny Hill Show, "Mahna Mahna" became familiar to many from its renditions by the Muppets on television. In 1969, the first season of Sesame Street featured a sketch featuring two Muppet girls voiced by Frank Oz and Loretta Long who are unsure of what to do, until they decide to sing a song. Enter an unusual-looking short, shaggy-haired male Muppet character who begins singing "Mahna Mahna", prompting the girls to join him. None of the characters had names at the time, but the male Muppet who led the "Mahna Mahna" call-and-response was eventually going by the alternate identity Bip Bippadotta (ref. Kip Addotta), so as to distinguish him from the official Mahna Mahna character that would be developed later on. The Muppet character called Mahna Mahna was originally performed by Muppets creator Jim Henson, and is now performed by Muppeteer veteran Bill Barretta.

On 30 November 1969, "Mahna Mahna" was performed on The Ed Sullivan Show by three new and more fully detailed Muppet characters. The male Muppet character was purple with wild, orange hair and a furry, green tunic, while the female Muppet characters were two identical pink cow-like alien creatures with horns and cone-like mouths (with yellow lips) that always remained open. At this point the male Muppet was given the name Mahna Mahna and the female alien creatures were called the Snowths (as a portmanteau of "snout" and "mouth" since their mouth also served as their noses), both performed by Muppeteer veteran Frank Oz. The song "Mahna Mahna" was played at a slower tempo and given a more playful, quintessential "children's"-style arrangement as opposed to the previous arrangement which was slightly reminiscent of early 1960s calypso music.

In 1976, on the first episode of The Muppet Show to be recorded (featuring Juliet Prowse), the 1969 "Mahna Mahna" routine from The Ed Sullivan Show was reworked and used as the first sketch with the same characters and a new recording of the last musical arrangement. The Muppet Show became an immediate hit and "Mahna Mahna" was the highlight of that episode. During the sketch, Mahna Mahna managed to dance his way backstage and out of the Muppet Theater, phoning the Snowths to sing the title lyrics one last time and end the song. At the end of the episode, he managed to enter Statler and Waldorf's box.

As a result, the original Piero Umiliani recording finally became a hit in the UK (#8 in the UK charts in May 1977), where the Muppet Show soundtrack album featuring the Muppets' version went to number one. It was at that point that the name "Mahna Mahna and The Snouths" was given the incorrect credit of "Mahna Mahna and The Snowths," which has served as the definitive spelling ever since then. The single from the album 'Halfway down the stairs" reached the top Ten in the UK charts – and its B side was Mah Na Mah Na – making the song appear three times in the charts at the same time, albeit as a B side, the Piero Umiliani version and also a track on the album.

Later on in that same episode, a snippet of the song "Lullaby of Birdland" is 'hummed' during one of the improvisational passages, as part of a running gag involving "Mahna Mahna".

The later Muppet TV series Muppets Tonight (1996–1998) revisited it in a sketch with Sandra Bullock where Kermit the Frog visits a doctor to complain about weird things that happen to him whenever he says the word phenomena, namely the Snowths suddenly appear with musical accompaniment to sing their part of the song.

In the Muppets version of "Bohemian Rhapsody" at 00:02:25, the Snowths make a cameo appearance, singing the titular lyric.

The song is performed in the 2011 feature film The Muppets, in which various celebrities sing with the Snowths in the end credits.

Commercially licensed versions
In the late 1960s, the original tune was featured in an American television commercial, but the product being pitched has of yet been undetermined.

The Muppets filmed a new version of the song in 2005, for a New Zealand charity called CanTeen. In the ad, an updated version of the Mahna Mahna puppet was puppeteered and voiced by Bill Barretta, and the lyrics were changed to "Bandanana", supporting CanTeen's "Bandana Week".

It was featured in the 2005 pilot of the sitcom Committed where Marni attempted to get her date to sing a duet with her in a restaurant, and continued to appear in the background in later episodes as her ringtone.

In the 2011 episode "The Firefly" of Fringe, the song was playing on a record player in Walter Bishop's home while he was creating a formula to restore the missing pieces of his brain—pieces which were surgically removed years before in an agreement with William Bell.

In "This Is My House, This Is My Home," the (2011) season eight finale of One Tree Hill, Nathan Scott performs this song with his daughter, Lydia, as wife Haley James Scott watches.

At the BBC's Children in Need 2011 telethon, Kermit and Miss Piggy introduced a performance of the song, which featured many stars of British television, including Harry Hill, Noel Edmonds and Gary Lineker.

Cee Lo Green samples the song in his original Christmas song "All I Need Is Love" which features guest vocals by The Muppets for his 2012 holiday album Cee Lo's Magic Moment.

A modified version of the song featured in adverts for the BN biscuit in the United Kingdom, which referenced the biscuits' name.

The Australian sunscreen company Banana Boat used a version of the song with lyrics as a jingle.

In 2007, it was used for a Saturn Aura commercial.

In 2017, it served as the soundtrack for a Ford Explorer commercial, "For What Matters Most," in which a father and daughter make repeated trips to a hardware store while building a "Pinewood derby" car.

References

External links
 
 
 
 Mah nà Mah nà (song) on Piero Umiliani Official Website
 "Mahna Mahna": How a ditty from a soft-core Italian movie became the Muppets' catchiest tune. by Sam Adams, Slate, Nov. 23, 2011

Film theme songs
1968 songs
1968 singles
Sesame Street songs
The Muppets songs
Novelty songs
Giorgio Moroder songs
Songs written for films
Quotations from television
Comedy catchphrases
1968 neologisms